High Park is a  park in Toronto, Ontario, Canada dating to the late 1800s. Most of the original park was deeded by John Howard, architect and chief Toronto surveyor.

High Park may also refer to:
 High Park, Edmonton, a neighbourhood of Edmonton, Alberta, Canada
 High Park (electoral district), a former federal electoral district in the west end of Toronto, Ontario, Canada
 High Park station, a subway station in Toronto, Ontario, Canada
 High Park, Merseyside, the suburb of the town of Southport, UK
 High Park, Colorado, a region affected by the High Park fire in 2012

See also
 High Park North, a neighbourhood north of the park in Toronto, Ontario, Canada